Bradysia ismayi is a species of fungus gnat found in the British Isles.

References

Further reading

External links

Sciaridae
Insects described in 2006